Bill Stephenson (14 February 1937 – 10 August 2010) was  a former Australian rules footballer who played with St Kilda in the Victorian Football League (VFL).

Stephenson, recruited to St Kilda from Sale, was a Victorian representative in 1960, against both South Australia and Western Australia. A ruckman and centre half-forward in his early years at St Kilda, Stephenson was used later on as a full-forward, in which position he started the 1962 VFL season strongly. Five first half goals against Essendon in round four had brought Stephenson's season tally to 20, before he sustained a knee injury later in the game which curtailed his career.

Notes

External links 
		

1937 births
2010 deaths
Australian rules footballers from Victoria (Australia)
St Kilda Football Club players
Sale Football Club players